Springfield, Massachusetts, United States, features relatively few skyscrapers compared its peer cities, due to a 1908 Massachusetts state law limiting the city's building height to 125', which remained in effect until 1970. In 1907-08, the construction of 1200 Main Street caused such an outcry in both Springfield and Boston that the Massachusetts State Legislature passed a law limiting commercial building height in Springfield to 125' – the height of the steeple of Springfield's Old First Church (the fourth incarnation of which had been constructed in 1819). As a consequence, Springfield did not develop a modern skyline in the pre-World War II styles of art deco or neo-classicism; however, many 'human-scale' versions of both styles exist in Springfield.

Springfield's height limit was broached purposely in 1970, after the U.S. government had closed the Springfield Armory and many residents began to complain that Springfield looked too Victorian, architecturally. The Baystate West tower (now known as Tower Square, bearing MassMutual's name), standing 371', was designed that year in the brutalist International style by renowned architect Pietro Belluschi. Several major downtown projects followed in the 1970s and 1980s, creating an impressive modern skyline accented by the Campanile tower of 1913 (the one building which was allowed to breach the height law imposed on Springfield by Massachusetts).

See also
Springfield Municipal Group
Hotel Kimball
Springfield Memorial Bridge
 List of tallest buildings in Boston
 List of tallest buildings in Cambridge, Massachusetts
 List of tallest buildings in Worcester, Massachusetts
 List of tallest buildings in Massachusetts, exclusive of Boston

References

Springfield
Springfield, Massachusetts
Tallest buildings, Springfield
Tallest buildings, Springfield
Springfield